The Greene Correctional Facility is a state prison for men located in Coxsackie, Greene County, New York, owned and operated by the New York State Department of Corrections and Community Supervision.

The facility opened in 1989 and holds 1582 inmates at medium security, which includes 171 held in a maximum security unit.  Greene is adjacent to the state's Coxsackie Correctional Facility, originally built in 1935. Violent felony offenders housed at this jail are responsible for the death of numerous other inmates while in custody at this facility.  The inmates at this facility are also responsible for numerous assaults on staff.

References

Prisons in New York (state)
Buildings and structures in Greene County, New York
1984 establishments in New York (state)